The Great Lakes, a collection of five freshwater lakes located in North America, have been sailed upon since at least the 17th century, and thousands of ships have been sunk while traversing them. Many of these ships were never found, so the exact number of shipwrecks in the Lakes is unknown; the Great Lakes Shipwreck Museum approximates 6,000 ships and 30,000 lives lost, while historian and mariner Mark Thompson has estimated that the total number of wrecks is likely more than 25,000. In the period between 1816, when the Invincible was lost, to the sinking of the Edmund Fitzgerald in 1975, the Whitefish Point area alone has claimed at least 240 ships.

Lake Superior

Lake Huron

Lake Michigan

Lake Erie

Lake Ontario
{| class="wikitable sortable"
|+
!Ship
!Sunk Date
!Notes
!Coordinates
|-
|Schooner Milan
|10 November 1849
|Directly in front of Oak Orchard, New York in deep water
|
|-
|James H. Shrigley Coal Barge
|
|On Wautoma Shoals in shallow water
|
|-
|Undine
|
|Northeast of Wautoma Shoals in 40 feet of water
|
|-
|Laura Grace Steamer
|data-sort-value="0-0-1930" |1930
|Directly in front of Long Pond Outlet in Greece, NY
|
|-
|Unidentified Wreck
|
|Northeast of Rochester Harbor Breakwalls in 40 feet of water
|
|-
|Twin Unidentified Wrecks
|
|East of the eastern break wall entering Rochester harbor in shallow water
|
|-
|Henry Roney
|24 October 1879
|Directly in front of Webster, NY in 70 feet of water
|
|-
|US Coast Guard Boat 56022
|1 December 1977
|Sunk during a violent storm en route from Oswego to Niagara. Between Ontario on the Lake and Pultneyville in front of the submerged pipeline in 32 feet of water
|
|-
|Steamer Perseverance
|
|Directly in front of Pultneyville, NY in deep water
|
|-
|Saint Peter
|
|Northeast of the Pultneyville Outer Range rear light in 100 feet of water
|
|-
|Orcadian
|5 August 1858
|Directly outside of Sodus Bay harbor on the western side of the harbor entrance in shallow water
|
|-
|Etta Belle
|9 March 1873
|Directly outside of Sodus Bay harbor on the eastern side of the harbor entrance in shallow water
|
|-
|The Porter
|
|Inside Little Sodus Bay along the break wall separating the lake from the bay on the east side of the channel
|
|-
|Congercoal
|5 November 1917
|Inside Little Sodus Bay along Fair Haven Beach State Park's western shoreline. Just off the parking lot and south of the boat launch.
|
|-
|David W. Mills
|8 November 1919
|The wooden lake freighter ran aground on a reef and was broken apart by waves over time.
|
|-
|Mary Kay
|
|In 54 feet of water just northeast of Snake Creek
|
|-
|Cormorant
|
|Northwest of the Mary Kay and northeast of the David Mills in 165 feet of water
|
|-
|Robert Bruce
|
|Near North Sandy Pond
|
|-
|Cortez
|
|Directly off of Southwick Beach State Park
|
|-
|Hartford
|
|Near North Sandy Pond, part of the ship has also washed ashore on the North Sandy Pond Barrier Bar
|
|-
|Ariadne
|
|North of North Sandy Pond in shallow water are the remains of the Ariadne
|
|-
|William Elgin 
|21 May 1818
|
|
|-
|The T. J. Waffle Steamer
|
|27 miles off Oswego, NY
|
|-
|Dagger-board Schooner
|
|Near Galloo Island
|
|-
|City of New York
|26 November 1921
|The lake freighter sank in a storm off Stony Point with the loss of nine lives.
|
|-
|Onandaga Schooner
|
|Off Stony Point, NY
|
|-
|Steamer Wisconsin
|
|Off Tibbetts Point Lighthouse
|
|-
|Hiawatha Schooner Barge
|
|In 95 feet of water; discovered September 2017 by Tim Caza
|
|-
|H. B. Schooner-barge
|
|Eastern Lake Ontario 20 miles off the Oswego shoreline
|
|-
|Menominee
|
|Northeastern Lake Ontario off Galloo Island
|
|-
|Old Steamer
|
|Eastern Lake Ontario in 90 feet of water
|
|-
|North Star
|26 November 1886
|The schooner sank with a load of coal off Stony Island
|
|-
|American 
|1 October 1894
|The schooner sank with a load of coal off Stony Point
|
|-
|J.W. Langmuir
|7 October 1875
|The schooner sank with a load of Lumber off Gallo Island
|
|-
|S.S. Ellsworth
|9 July 1877
|The steamer caught fire and burned off Stony Point.
|
|-
|House Boat
|
|Located in Chaumont Bay
|
|-
|Alberta
|
|A Lake tug with the appearance of an Alligator tug from the Ottawa River logging days, sank near Bay of Quinte.
|
|-
|Aloha
|data-sort-value="0-0-1917" | 1917
|Sunk while in tow of the CW Chamberlain off Nine Mile Point
| 
|-
|Annie Falconer
|data-sort-value="0-0-1904" | 1904
|A schooner that sank in a storm en route to Picton. One crew member perished of exposure upon reaching Amherst Island.
|
|-
|Augustus
|
|A schooner that sank en route to be scuttled during the 1937 Portsmouth harbour cleanup.
|
|-
|Bay State
|4 November 1862
|Screw propeller, sank in storm. Wreck discovered August 2015.
|
|-
|Belle Sheridan
|7 November 1880
|A 123-foot, two-masted schooner. She was carrying coal en route to Toronto when caught in the Gale of 1880 and after fighting for hours, sank in 12 feet of water in Wellers Bay. Only one of the crew of seven survived.
|
|-
|China
|data-sort-value="0-0-1872" | 1872
|A small steamer that caught fire and sank off False Duck Island, six months after launching.
| 
|-
|City of Sheboygan
|data-sort-value="0-0-1925" | 1925
|Sank in a storm off Amherst Island with the loss of 5 people.
|
|-
|Comet
|data-sort-value="0-0-1861" | 1861
|A paddlewheeler that sunk in a collision with the schooner Exchange''' off Nine Mile Point, with the loss of 2 lives.
|
|-
|Cornwall|data-sort-value="0-0-1931" | 1931
|A paddlewheeler scuttled in the Amherst Island graveyard.
|
|-
|Dominion|
|
|
|-
|Dredge Islander|
|A dredge scuttled in the Snake Island graveyard after harbour cleanup in the 1930s.
|
|-
|Dupont Salvage Scow|
|Scuttled near Dupont Point, perhaps after the Elevator Bay cleanup.
|
|-
|Effie Mae|data-sort-value="0-0-1993" | 1993
|A charter boat that was scuttled beside the Aloha for a diving attraction
|
|-
|Empress| 
|A steamer scuttled in the Amherst Island Graveyard. Real name unknown.
|
|-
|Frontenac|
|Tug.
|
|-
|George A. Marsh|17 August 1917
|A schooner that was sunk during a heavy gale off Pigeon Island. Twelve of fourteen crew and passengers died.
|
|-
|George T Davie|
|Barge.
|
|-
|Glendora|
|A steamer that was scuttled in the Amherst Island Graveyard. Real name unknown.
|
|-
|USS Hamilton
|8 August 1813
|A US Navy schooner that sunk in a squall off Fourteen Mile Creek, Oakville. A US sister ship the Scourge sank in the same squall.
|
|-
|Hilda|
|Wrecker.
|
|-
|Katie Eccles
|
|Ran aground near Kingston on Lake Ontario.
|
|-
|KPH Wreck
| 
|
|-
|Londonderry|
|Wrecker.
|
|-
|Maple Glen|
|Steamer.
|
|-
|Marine Museum 2|
|Scow.
|
|-
|Mark One|
|Tug.
|
|-
|Monkey Wrench| 
|A schooner that was scuttled in the Amherst Island Graveyard. Real name unknown.
|
|-
|Munson|30 April 1890 
|A dredger that sank in 4 minutes due to leaking plank, off Lemoine Point.
|
|-
|Nisbet Grammer|26 May 1926
|A lake freighter that sank in a collision with the Dalwarnic off Somerset.
|
|-
|SS Noronic
|17 September 1949
|A Great Lakes cruise ship that burned and sank at Toronto dock, with over 100 passengers killed.
|
|-
|Ocean Wave|data-sort-value="0-0-1853" | 1853
|Paddlewheeler.
|
|-
|Olive Branch|30 September 1880
|Schooner
|
|- 
|Oliver Mowat|9 January 1921
|Schooner
|
|-
|HMS Ontario
|31 October 1780
|A British 22-gun brig-sloop sunk in a storm on Lake Ontario, discovered in 2008. The oldest shipwreck ever found on the Great Lakes.
|
|-
|St. Peter
|27 October 1898
|A schooner that was wrecked near Pultneyville.
|
|-
|Queen Mary| 
|A steamer that was scuttled in the Amherst Island Graveyard. Real name unknown.
|
|-
|R.H. Rae|8 April 1858
|Schooner.
|
|-
|Ricky's Tug|
|Scuttled in the Amherst Island Graveyard. Real name unknown.
|
|-
|Ridgetown
|data-sort-value="0-0-1974" |1974
|The retired lake freighter was sunk as a break water off Mississauga, Ontario.
|
|-
|HMS St Lawrence
|
|A wooden warship that served in the War of 1812. The ship was decommissioned and her hull was used as a storage facility by Morton's Brewery in Kingston. In January 1832, the hull was sold to Robert Drummond for £25. Later, it was sunk close to shore, and is now a popular diving attraction.
|
|-
|S.M. Douglas|
|A former White Star dredger.
|
|-
|HMS Speedy
|8 October 1804
|A schooner that sank off Brighton, Lake Ontario.
|
|-
|USS Sylph
|data-sort-value="0-0-1823" | 1823
|A schooner that served in the War of 1812.
|
|-
|Terry's Tug|
|Tug.
|
|-
|HMS Toronto
|data-sort-value="0-0-1811" | 1811
|A schooner that sank off Hanlan's Point, Toronto Islands, Lake Ontario.
|
|-
|Unknown
|
|
|
|-
|Washington|data-sort-value="0-0-1803" |1803
|Commercial sloop owned by Canadians, built by Americans on Lake Erie, sunk off Oswego.
|
|-
|Waterlily|
|Steam barge.
|
|-
|William Jamieson|15 May 1923
|Schooner.
|
|-
|William Johnston|
|A tug that sank off 9-Mile Point.
|
|-
|HMS Wolfe (later HMS Montreal)
| 
|A freshwater sloop of war that served in the War of 1812. She was ordered broken up and sold in 1831, and is presumed to have rotted and sunk at Kingston. The wreck, identified as HMS Montreal by Parks Canada in 2006, lies near the Royal Military College of Canada.
|
|-
|Wolfe Islander II
|21 September 1985
|Car ferry scuttled to provide scuba attraction off Dawson's Point, Wolfe Island 
|
|}

Largest wrecks

See also
List of shipwrecks of western Lake Superior
List of Great Lakes shipwrecks on the National Register of Historic Places

References

External links

 The Great Lakes Shipwreck File, a list maintained by David D. Swayze which details over 4,900 shipwrecks. (Archived by the Wayback Machine.)
 Great Lakes Hold Fortune in Treasure, Port Light'', Volume 3, Number 43, Door County, Wisconsin, November 15, 1945, page 3

Further reading
  Thumbnail histories, descriptions and locations of more than 1,000 Great Lakes shipwrecks located to date.
 . A guide to hundreds of northern Lake Michigan shipwrecks.
  Detailed stories of 100 significant shipwrecks, plus, in appendices, brief information about several hundreds more.
  Detailed stories of 100 significant shipwrecks, plus, in appendices, brief information about several hundreds more.
  Identifies 110 wreck locations.
  Identifies 103 wreck locations.
  Identifies 45 wreck locations.

Great Lakes
Great Lakes
Great Lakes shipwrecks
Shipwrecks
Michigan transportation-related lists